Farid Ahmad Paracha (ڈاکٹر فرید احمد پراچہ) (born November 10, 1949) is a Pakistani Politician, businessman and a naib ameer (vice-president) of Jamaat-e-Islami. He also served as member of the 12th National Assembly of Pakistan from 2002 to 2007 and Member of the Provincial Assembly of the Punjab from 1990 to 1993.

Early life and education
Paracha was born on November 10, 1949 in Bhera, Sargodha. He earned his LL.B degree in 1975, M.A. in 1976 and Ph.D. degree from University of the Punjab in 2005.

References

Living people
1949 births
Pakistani MNAs 2002–2007
Punjab MPAs 1990–1993
University of the Punjab alumni
Jamaat-e-Islami Pakistan politicians
People from Sargodha
People from Lahore